Amidephrine, or amidefrine, is a sulfonamide α1-adrenergic receptor agonist.

References 

Alpha-1 adrenergic receptor agonists
Phenylethanolamines
Sulfonamides